List of New Deal sculpture is a list of sculpture found in the United States and its territories, including free standing, relief and architectural sculpture that was funded by the federal government during the New Deal era.

These include works produced under the Public Works of Art Project, (1933–1934), Treasury Relief Art Project, (1935–1938), Federal Art Projects (1935–1943), the Treasury Section of Painting and Sculpture (1934–1943) and other federally sponsored projects.

Unless otherwise noted, sources are from Park and Markowitz or American Art Annual, 1941. "USPO" refers to a United States Post Office building, the term "relief" refers to relief sculpture.

Alabama

Alaska

Arizona

Arkansas

California

Colorado

Connecticut

Delaware

District of Columbia

Florida

Georgia

Hawaii

Idaho

Illinois

Indiana

Iowa

Kansas

Kentucky

Louisiana

Maine

Maryland

Massachusetts

Michigan

Minnesota

Mississippi

Missouri

Montana

Nebraska

Nevada
There are no New Deal sculptures in Nevada.

New Hampshire

New Jersey

New Mexico

New York

North Carolina

North Dakota

Ohio

Oklahoma

Oregon

Pennsylvania

Rhode Island

South Carolina

South Dakota

Tennessee

Texas

Utah

Vermont

Virginia

Washington

West Virginia

Wisconsin

Wyoming

See also
 List of New Deal murals
 List of United States federal courthouses
 List of Art Deco architecture in the United States

References

External links
 

New Deal

Public Works of Art Project
Section of Painting and Sculpture
Treasury Relief Art Project